Jeanne Larsen (born 1950 in Washington, D.C.) is a poet, novelist, translator, and essayist. Much of her work shows the growing influence of Buddhist perspectives on U.S. literature. This includes not only the poetry and creative nonfiction, but also the novels in her Avalokiteśvara trilogy: Silk Road, Bronze Mirror, and Manchu Palaces.

Biography
Larsen grew up on U.S. Army posts in Kansas, Virginia, Pennsylvania and Germany. A graduate of Oberlin College, she received her M.A. from Hollins College and her Ph.D. in Comparative Literature from The University of Iowa. She has also lived, worked, and studied in Taiwan and Japan. In 1980, she moved to the Roanoke Valley of Virginia in the United States, where she taught literature and creative writing at Hollins University until 2019.

Published works

 What Penelope Chooses: Poems (poetry). Cider Press Review, 2019.
 Why We Make Gardens (& Other Poems) (poetry). Mayapple Press, 2010.
 Sally Paradiso (novel). Brown Fedora Books, 2009. 
 Willow, Wine, Mirror, Moon: Women’s Poems from Tang China  (literary translations). BOA Editions, Ltd., 2005.
 These Gardens (art book; poems by Jeanne Larsen, drawings by Jan Knipe) privately printed limited edition, 2003.
 Manchu Palaces (novel). Henry Holt & Co., October 1996; abridged audiotape version: Audio Literature, 1997; reprint Authors Guild/iUniverse 2009. 
 Bronze Mirror (novel). Henry Holt & Co 1991;, Book of the Month Club 1991; Fawcett (paperback) 1992; Mondadori (Italy) 1992; Centrum (Denmark) 1992; reprint Authors Guild/iUniverse 2009. [Bronze Mirror, an opera based on this book, libretto & score by Milton Granger, was premiered by the Georgia State University School of Music, April 19 & 20, 2002]
 Silk Road (novel). Henry Holt & Co. 1989; Heinemann (U.K.) 1989; Book of the Month Club 1989; Fawcett (U.S. paperback) 1990; Mandarin (U.K. paperback) 1991; Centrum (Denmark) 1990; Rizzoli (Italy) 1990; Heyne (Germany) 1991; Divisione Euroclub Italia (Italy) 1991; reprint Authors Guild/iUniverse 2009. 
 Engendering the Word: Feminist Essays in Psychosexual Poetics (literary criticism). Temma F. Berg, ed.; co-editors, Anna Shannon Elfenbein, Jeanne Larsen, Elisa Kay Sparks. University of Illinois Press, 1989
 Brocade River Poems: Selected Works of the Tang Dynasty Courtesan Xue Tao (literary translations) Princeton University Press, 1987. 
 James Cook in Search of Terra Incognita: A Book of Poems. University Press of Virginia (Associated Writing Programs Poetry Series), 1979.

Awards
Larsen is the recipient of a Japan/U.S. Friendship Commission Creative Artists Exchange Fellowship (creative nonfiction), an Individual Artist Fellowship (fiction) from the Virginia Commission for the Arts, a National Endowment for the Arts Fellowship (literary translation), the William L. Crawford Award for the year’s best new novelist from the International Association for the Fantastic in the Arts and student prizes from the Academy of American Poets.

She has also received residency fellowships from the Millay Colony for the Arts, the Byrdcliffe Artists Colony, The Hambidge Center for Creative Arts & Sciences, Ragdale, the Virginia Center for the Creative Arts, the Eastern Frontier Society, and the Bread Loaf Writers’ Conference. The School for Criticism and Theory and the American Council of Learned Societies/Mellon Foundation have awarded her academic fellowships, and she first went to Taiwan on an Oberlin Shansi teaching-study fellowship.

References

External links
  official website 
 Review of Silk Road from DannyReviews.com
 Reviews of Bronze Mirror and Manchu Palaces from DannyReviews.com
 Review of Willow, Wine, Mirror, Moon from a personal blog
 Review of Brocade River Poems from JSTOR.org
  review of "Why We Make Gardens" from therumpus.net

1950 births
Living people
20th-century American novelists
21st-century American novelists
American women novelists
Hollins University alumni
Oberlin College alumni
American women poets
American women essayists
20th-century American women writers
21st-century American women writers
20th-century American poets
21st-century American poets
20th-century American translators
21st-century American translators
20th-century American essayists
21st-century American essayists